Poriskina is a monotypic butterfly genus in the family Lycaenidae. Its sole species, Poriskina phakos, is known from Mindanao in the Philippines. Both the genus and the species were first described by Hamilton Herbert Druce in 1895.

References 
, 1940. A revision of the Malayan species of Poritiinae (Lepidoptera: Lycaenidae). Transactions of the Royal Entomological Society of London. 90: 337-350, 1 pl., 21 figs.
, 1895. A monograph of the Bornean Lycaenidae, Proceedings of the Zoological Society of London. 1895: 556-627, 4 pls.

External links

Poritiinae
Monotypic butterfly genera
Taxa named by Hamilton Herbert Druce
Lycaenidae genera